Tongdaewŏn-guyŏk  or Tongdaewon District is one of the 18 wards, and one of the six that constitute East Pyongyang, North Korea.  It sits on the eastern bank of the Taedong River.  It is north of Sŏn'gyo-guyŏk (Songyo District), south of Taedonggang-guyŏk  (Taedonggang District) and west of Sadong-guyŏk (Sadong District) and Ryŏkp'o-guyŏk (Ryokpho District). It was established in October 1960.

Administrative divisions
Tongdaewŏn-guyŏk is divided into 18 tong (neighbourhoods):

 Ryul-dong 률동(栗洞)
 Taesin-dong 대신동(大新洞)
 Munsin 1-dong 문신 1동 (文新 1洞)
 Munsin 2-dong 문신 2동 (文新 2洞)
 Tongdaewŏn 1-dong 동대원 1동 (東大院 1洞)
 Tongdaewŏn 2-dong 동대원 2동 (東大院 2洞)
 Sinhŭng 1-dong 신흥 1동 (新興 1洞)
 Sinhŭng 2-dong 신흥 2동 (新興 2洞)
 Sinhŭng 3-dong 신흥 3동 (新興 3洞)
 Silli-dong 신리동 (新里洞)
 Tongsin 1-dong 동신 1동 (東新 1洞)
 Tongsin 2-dong 동신 2동 (東新 2洞)
 Tongsin 3-dong 동신 3동 (東新 3洞)
 Raengch'ŏn 1-dong 랭천 1동 (冷泉 1洞)
 Raengch'ŏn 2-dong 랭천 2동 (冷泉 2洞)
 Saesallim-dong 새살림동
 Samma 1-dong 삼마 1동 (三馬 1洞)
 Samma 2-dong 삼마 2동 (三馬 2洞)

Districts of Pyongyang